The 1928 Tour de France was the 22nd tour and featured the first appearance of an Australian-New Zealand team, indicating the beginning of a more international sporting field.

Tour director Henri Desgrange allowed teams to replace exhausted or injured cyclist by new cyclists, to give the weaker teams a fairer chance. However, the effects were opposite, so the concept was quickly abandoned.

By starting number

References

1928 Tour de France
1928